Celtic started the 2001–02 season looking to retain the Scottish Premier League, Scottish League Cup and the Scottish Cup. They entered the UEFA Champions League at the third qualifying round. They finished the season as league champions for the second season in succession.

Players
Squad at end of season

Left club during season

Reserve squad

Competitions
Results for Celtic F.C. for season 2001–02.

NOTE: scores are written Celtic first

Key:
SPL = Scottish Premier League
SC = Scottish Cup
SLC = Scottish League Cup
CLQ = Champions League Qualifier
CL = Champions League Match
UC = UEFA Cup match
F = Friendly match

Player statistics

Appearances and goals

List of squad players, including number of appearances by competition

|}
NB: Players with a zero in every column only appeared as unused substitutes

Team statistics

League table

Transfers

Players in
In:

Players out
Out:

See also
 List of Celtic F.C. seasons

Notes

References

Celtic F.C. seasons
Celtic
Scottish football championship-winning seasons